András Gergely may refer to:
 András Gergely (ice hockey) (1916–2008), Hungarian ice hockey player
 András Gergely (historian) (1946–2021), Hungarian historian and diplomat